Satyrium sassanides, the white-line hairstreak, is a small butterfly found in India that belongs to the lycaenids or blues family.

References
 

Satyrium (butterfly)
Butterflies of Asia
Butterflies described in 1850